Sesava Parish is an administrative unit of Jelgava Municipality in the Semigallia region of Latvia.

Towns, villages and settlements of Sesava parish 
  – parish administrative center

Notable people 
 Pēteris Juraševskis (1872–1945)
 Ludvigs Bolšteins (1888–1940)

See also 
 Galamuiža Manor

References 

Parishes of Latvia
Jelgava Municipality
Semigallia